Riegelsville is a borough in Bucks County, Pennsylvania, United States. The population was 868 at the 2010 census. It is included in the Philadelphia-Wilmington-Camden metropolitan statistical area, despite being so closely connected to the Lehigh Valley.

History

Benjamin Riegel founded Riegelsville. The original, and now historic, Riegelsville Inn that he built in 1838 still stands. This historic stone inn has offered food and lodging to Bucks County travelers for over 160 years. The community was named for the Riegel family, as early landowners. They established paper mills across the Delaware River in Warren County, New Jersey.

With the completion of the Delaware Canal in 1832, the lands along the Delaware River attracted great industrial development. The movement of coal, a major important product of the area, brought capital & investment to Easton. Boats carried coal, stone, iron, crops, and goods from the mills along the 60 miles from Easton to Bristol. Along Canal Street grew one of the largest industrial manufacturing centers of America during the 1830s and 1840s. Easton continued to prosper as a center for industry, manufacturing, commerce, and culture at the Forks of Delaware and along the great rail lines. Between 1904 and 1926, Riegelsville was served by electric passenger and freight trolleys of the Doylestown & Easton Street Railway Company. Riegelsville prospered when the Delaware Canal opened in 1832 with warehouses and factories lining its banks. The canal closed in 1931 after 99 years of service and was replaced by the railroads. Today, Riegelsville is a peaceful and quiet town. Woods and fields border the Delaware Canal; remnants of crumbling stone foundations along its banks are reminders of a busy past.

 
Riegelsville was a mill town in the late 1880s and 1900s. The borough overlooks the Delaware River, spanned by the Riegelsville Bridge, built in 1904 by John A. Roebling's Sons, Co. and connecting with Riegelsville, New Jersey. It is one of the approximately three dozen bridges spanning the Delaware River between Pennsylvania and New Jersey.

Residences near the river built by Riegel Paper Company executives in the late 1880s along "Mansions Row" have been restored.

The Benjamin Riegel House was added to the National Register of Historic Places in 1987.

Geography

Neighboring municipalities
Durham Township (west and south)
Holland Township, New Jersey (southeast)
Pohatcong Township, New Jersey (northeast)
Williams Township, Northampton County (north)

Demographics

At the 2010 census, the borough was 96.8% White, 0.2% Black or African American, 0.3% Native American, 0.2% Asian and 0.5% were two or more races. 2.0% of the population were of Hispanic or Latino ancestry.

At the 2000 census, there were 863 people, 378 households and 250 families residing in the borough. The racial make-up of the borough was 99.19% White, 0.12% African American, 0.23% Asian, 0.35% from other races and 0.12% from two or more races. Hispanic or Latino of any race were 0.58% of the population.

There were 378 households, of which 26.5% had children under the age of 18 living with them, 51.6% were married couples living together, 10.1% had a female householder with no husband present and 33.6% were non-families. 28.3% of all households were made up of individuals, and 12.2% had someone living alone who was 65 years of age or older. The average household size was 2.28 and the average family size was 2.77.

21.3% of the population were under the age of 18, 5.2% from 18 to 24, 32.9% from 25 to 44, 25.0% from 45 to 64 and 15.5% who were 65 years of age or older. The median age was 40 years. For every 100 females, there were 100.2 males. For every 100 females age 18 and over, there were 93.4 males.

The median household income was $48,194 and the median family income was $55,208. Males had a median income of $41,250 and females $31,726. The per capita income was $24,916. About 2.0% of families and 3.3% of the population were below the poverty line, including 1.2% of those under age 18 and 6.7% of those age 65 or over.

Education
Formerly located in the Easton Area School District, Riegelsville is now in the Palisades School District.

Weather and climate
According to the Köppen climate classification system, Riegelsville has a Hot-summer, Humid continental climate (Dfa). Dfa climates are characterized by at least one month having an average mean temperature ≤ , at least four months with an average mean temperature ≥ , at least one month with an average mean temperature ≥  and no significant precipitation difference between seasons. Although most summer days are slightly humid in Riegelsville, episodes of heat and high humidity can occur with heat index values > . The average wettest month is July, which corresponds with the annual peak in thunderstorm activity. Episodes of extreme cold and wind can occur, with wind chill values < . Ice storms and large snowstorms depositing ≥  of snow occur once every few years, particularly during nor’easters from December through February.

Transportation

Pennsylvania Route 611 is the only numbered highway serving Riegelsville. It traverses the central portion of the borough on a north-south alignment via Easton Road.

Ecology
According to the A. W. Kuchler U.S. potential natural vegetation types, Riegelsville has a dominant vegetation type of Appalachian Oak (104) with a dominant vegetation form of Eastern Hardwood Forest (25). The spring bloom typically begins by April 12 and fall color usually peaks by October 28.

References

1834 establishments in Pennsylvania
Boroughs in Bucks County, Pennsylvania
Pennsylvania populated places on the Delaware River
Populated places established in 1834